Aigueperse is the name of two communes in France:

 Aigueperse, Puy-de-Dôme, in the Puy-de-Dôme département
 Aigueperse, Rhône, in the Rhône département